André Ernesto Stoffel, also commonly known simply as André (born 9 April 1960) is a Brazilian former professional basketball player.

Career
During his pro club career, Stoffel won 4 Brazilian Championships, in the seasons 1982, 1985, 1986 (I), and 1986 (II), while a member of C.A. Monte Líbano.

With the senior men's Brazilian national basketball team, Stoffel played at the 1980 Summer Olympic Games, and the 1982 FIBA World Cup.

References

External links
 

1960 births
Living people
Basketball players at the 1980 Summer Olympics
Brazilian men's basketball players
1982 FIBA World Championship players
Centers (basketball)
Clube Atlético Monte Líbano basketball players
Olympic basketball players of Brazil
Basketball players from São Paulo